Religio Laici, Or A Layman's Faith (1682) is a poem written in heroic couplets by John Dryden. It was written in response to the publication of an English translation of the Histoire critique due vieux testament by the French cleric Father Richard Simon. Simon's book applied detailed criticism to the textual history of the Bible and argued that, given the compromised nature of much of the Bible, Christians would do better to base their faith on the history and traditions of the Roman Catholic Church.

The tendency of Simon's book was to undermine Protestantism, which prioritises the authority of the Bible over the traditions and rituals of the Catholic Church, and so Dryden set out in Religio Laici to address the issues raised by Simon's book, along with other religious issues of his times such as Deism, in order to assert the validity of the teachings of the Church of England.

Sections 
Religio Laici consists of 462 lines of consecutive rhyming couplets. Although it is not divided by breaks or headings into parts or sections, Dryden added notes in the margins to indicate the topics and issues addressed in each section of the poem. These are (in the original spelling):

 Opinions of the several sects of Philosophers concerning the Summum Bonum
 System of Deism
 Of Reveal'd Religion
 Objection of the Deist
 The Objection answer'd
 Digression to the Translator of Father Simon's Critical History of the Old Testament
 Of the infallibility of Tradition, in General
 Objection in behalf of Tradition; urg'd by Father Simon
 The Second Objection
 Answer to the Objection

Excerpt
Dryden concludes the poem with a plea for moderation in all things including religious debate. On this subject, more than all others, it behoves each citizen to 'curb' their 'private Reason' (or opinions) rather than disturb 'the publick Peace'. It is notable that the climax of this long series of complex religious arguments is social rather than religious: 'Common quiet is Mankind's concern'.

The Hind and the Panther 
Five years after publishing Religio Laici Dryden drastically changed his position and converted to Roman Catholicism. He published a long and complex allegorical poem in three parts, The Hind and the Panther (1687) to explain his conversion. The fact that he converted a few years into the rule of the Catholic king, James II, prompted much scorn and derision from contemporaries.

Notes

External links 
 Online edition at The Literature Network

Poetry by John Dryden
1680s poems
Christian poetry